The national freediving records for the Cayman Islands are maintained by the Cayman Islands Freediving Association (CFA).

Freediving records can be set in any of 6 categories:

Constant weight
Static apnea
Dynamic apnea
Free immersion
Variable weight 
No-limits

Record attempts are generally made during competitions or at special events. Variable weight and no-limits are not competitive disciplines and so attempts in these categories need to be specially arranged.

Records and achievements 

The first official competition dive to a depth of beyond 200 ft occurred on 6 May 2018 - CWT - Richard Collett

References

Freediving
 
Cayman Islands